is a railway station on the Chūō-Sōbu Line in Shinjuku, Tokyo, Japan, operated by East Japan Railway Company (JR East).

Station layout
Ōkubo has a single island platform serving two tracks. Westbound trains to Mitaka stop at track 1, while eastbound trains to central Tokyo and Chiba use track 2. In addition, there are two express tracks east of track 2; these are used by Chūō Line (Rapid) trains that bypass the station.

Platforms

History
Ōkubo station opened on 5 May 1895 as part of the Kinoe railway with both passenger and freight rail services. On 1 October 1906, the station and all trains serving were nationalised into Japanese National Railways (JNR). Twenty-five years later in 1931, freight services were discontinued at Ōkubo station. Upon the privatisation of JNR on 1 April 1989, Ōkubo station became part of JR East, which comprises all trains serving the eastern and northern sections of Honshu. Beginning in November 2001, the Suica RFID-based electronic ticketing system has been accepted at Ōkubo station.

Surrounding area
Ōkubo station is located in the northern section of Shinjuku in the neighbourhood of the same name. One of Tokyo's largest Korean areas, Ōkubo is to the northwest of the centre of Shinjuku.

About  to the east lies Shin-Ōkubo Station on the Yamanote Line. Despite their proximity as well as being owned by JR East, the two stations are not connected. Passengers wishing to change from the Chūō-Sōbu Line to the Yamanote Line must do so at the next eastbound stop, Shinjuku.

Near the station, Okubo-dori (Okubo street) and surrounding side streets are lined with shops selling Korean food and pop-culture items. Also in the vicinity are Korean-themed bars, nightclubs, and restaurants.

Passenger statistics
In fiscal 2011, the station was used by an average of 23,997 passengers daily (boarding passengers only).

References

External links

 JR East Ōkubo Station 

Railway stations in Japan opened in 1895
Chūō-Sōbu Line
Chūō Main Line
Stations of East Japan Railway Company
Railway stations in Tokyo